FV Hospital is a leading tertiary care provider in Ho Chi Minh City, Vietnam. Inaugurated in 2003 by a group of French physicians, the hospital has a 150 full-time physicians, 1000 staff, serving half a million patient visits a year. Patients came from 68 countries and territories all over the world. Dr. Jean-Marcel Guillon is the co-founder and CEO of FV Hospital.

The FVH Medicine Vietnam association (funded by private sponsors) was established for free-of-charge medical care for children who require surgery.

FV Hospital is known for its special Division of Oncology named Hope Cancer Center, Obstetric and Gynecology, Pediatric, Ophthalmology, Gastroenterology and Hepatology, and Radiology department.

In December 2013, the FV Saigon Clinic was opened in the Bitexco Financial Tower in District 1 in Ho Chi Minh City.

Accreditation 
FV Hospital was accredited in March 2016, by the Joint Commission International (JCI) in the Hospital Program, becoming the second international hospital in Vietnam to be accredited by Joint Commission International.

Training 
The hospital has opened admission programs for Elective (medical) and fellowship. MBBS and Doctor of Medicine students from various parts of the world have sought FV Hospital for their internship and fellowship. Many of them are from Imperial College London, University of Warwick, University of California, Los Angeles, Yale University, University of Stanford, Harvard Medical School, University of California, Irvine, University of Western Australia, University of New South Wales, Monash University and National University of Singapore.

See also
List of hospitals in Vietnam

References

Hospitals in Ho Chi Minh City